The Thakurbari Temple is a Hindu temple located in Gangtok, Sikkim, India, in the heart of the town. It is one of the oldest Hindu temples in Sikkim built on land donated by the erstwhile Chogyal of Sikkim in 1935. The temple houses almost all major deities and has emerged as an important center of convergence for the Hindu community of Gangtok.

Upgrades
Subsequently, the temple was upgraded to a major temple-complex in the time period between 1945 and 1947.

In 2011, the temple complex was further upgraded to include a multipurpose hall and library. Completion was expected by 2012.

 the temple was incomplete due to shortage of funds. Another Rs. 3 crore is required to complete the mandir.

References

External links 

Gangtok
Hindu temples in Sikkim

Tourist attractions in Sikkim